For the lower house seats in the Victorian Legislative Assembly, see South Bourke 1856–1889, or Evelyn and Mornington 1856–1859.

The Electoral district of South Bourke, Evelyn and Mornington was one of the sixteen electoral districts of the original unicameral Victorian Legislative Council of 1851 to 1856.

From 1856 onwards, the Victorian parliament consisted of two houses, the Victorian Legislative Council (upper house, consisting of Provinces) and the Victorian Legislative Assembly (lower house).

Members of South Bourke, Evelyn and Mornington
One member originally, two from the expanded Council of 1853.

Miller went on to represent Central Province in the Legislative Council from November 1856.
Dane later represented the Electoral district of Warrnambool in the Victorian Legislative Assembly from November 1864.
Chapman later represented the Electoral district of St Kilda in the Victorian Legislative Assembly from January 1858 and Electoral district of Mornington from August 1861.

See also

 Parliaments of the Australian states and territories
 List of members of the Victorian Legislative Council

External links
Electoral Districts of West Bourke South Bourke and East Bourke and Electoral district of  Evelyn and Mornington 1855 Map at State Library of Victoria

References

Former electoral districts of Victorian Legislative Council
1851 establishments in Australia
1856 disestablishments in Australia